Kevin Palmer may refer to:

 Kevin Palmer (singer), singer with Trust Company
 Kevin Palmer (basketball) (born 1587), American basketball player
 Kevin Palmer, English timeshare salesman who disappeared in March 1999